UUE may refer to:

 Uuencode
 Ununennium, symbol Uue for '119', a theoretical chemical element